UMS may refer to:

 Ulnar–mammary syndrome
 Underwriting Management System, for automated Insurance Underwriting
 Unfederated Malay States
 Unified Messaging (System, Server, or Service)
 Uniform Mark Scheme
 United Mexican States (official name of Mexico)
 UMS, abbreviation of "Universal Measurement System" used for Gross tonnage
 Universal Media Server
 Universal Media Studios
 Universal Mobile Systems
 Muhammadiyah University of Surakarta (Universitas Muhammadiyah Surakarta, in Indonesia)
 Universiti Malaysia Sabah (in Malaysia)
 University of Maine System
 University of Mississippi
 USB mass storage device class
 User-Mode Scheduling, Preemption (computing)
 UMS 1905 (Indonesian football club)